Caryocolum bosalella is a moth of the family Gelechiidae. It is found on Corsica and Sardinia.

The length of the forewings is about 5 mm for males and females. The forewings are dark brown, but the dorsal margin is brown mixed with white. There is an irregular white patch across the cell at one-fifth and one-half. Adults are on wing from early August to early September.

References

Moths described in 1936
bosalella
Moths of Europe